Leonard Deshawn Humphries (born June 19, 1970) is a former American football defensive back who played one season with the Indianapolis Colts of the National Football League (NFL). He was drafted by the Buffalo Bills in the eighth round of the 1992 NFL Draft. He played college football at Pennsylvania State University and attended North High School in Akron, Ohio. Humphries was also a member of the Ottawa Rough Riders, BC Lions and Toronto Argonauts of the Canadian Football League.

References

External links
Just Sports Stats
College stats

Living people
1970 births
Players of American football from Akron, Ohio
American football defensive backs
Canadian football defensive backs
African-American players of American football
African-American players of Canadian football
Penn State Nittany Lions football players
Indianapolis Colts players
Ottawa Rough Riders players
BC Lions players
Toronto Argonauts players
21st-century African-American sportspeople
20th-century African-American sportspeople